Serhiy Shevchenko or Serhii Shevchenko may refer to:

 Serhiy Shevchenko (footballer, born 1960), Kyrgyz-Ukrainian footballer
 Serhiy Shevchenko (footballer, born 1958), Soviet Ukrainian footballer and coach
 Serhiy Shevchenko (footballer, born 1953), Soviet Ukrainian footballer and coach
 Serhiy Shevchenko (diplomat) (born 1908), Soviet diplomat from Ukraine
 Serhii Shevchenko (born 1960), Ukrainian writer and journalist

See also
 Shevchenko, a family name